Clathromangelia quadrillum is an extinct species of sea snail, a marine gastropod mollusk in the family Raphitomidae.

This name has often been misapplied to the Recent Clathromangelia granum (Philippi, 1844)

Description

Distribution
This extinct species was distributed in the Mediterranean Sea, dating from the Miocene. It was also found in strata from the Late Pliocene in Malaga (Spain).

References

 Cossmann (M.), 1896 Essais de Paléoconchologie comparée (2ème livraison), p. 1-179

External links
   Bouchet P., Kantor Yu.I., Sysoev A. & Puillandre N. (2011) A new operational classification of the Conoidea. Journal of Molluscan Studies 77: 273-308

quadrillum